What We Become may refer to:
 What We Become (film), a 2015 Danish horror film
 What We Become (The Walking Dead), an episode of the television series The Walking Dead